Red Brook is a tributary of Stony Brook in Wyoming County, Pennsylvania, in the United States. The stream has been named one of the best places for hiking in Wyoming County and features waterfalls, cascades, cliffs, and boulders. Its headwaters are in Coalbed Swamp, a combined boreal conifer swamp and shrub swamp.

Course
Red Brook begins on Dutch Mountain in Coalbed Swamp, in Forkston Township. It flows northeast for a short distance before turning east-southeast and entering a valley. After several tenths of a mile, the stream turns east-northeast for several tenths of a mile. It then reaches its confluence with Stony Brook.

Geography and geology

Geographical features along Red Brook include two large waterfalls, a number of smaller cascades, large boulders (some of which are covered with moss), and cliffs. The headwaters of the stream are located in Coalbed Swamp, which is part of a complex of wetlands at the summit of Dutch Mountain.

Hydrology and watershed
The stream is entirely within the United States Geological Survey quadrangle of Dutch Mountain. Its mouth is located near Kasson Brook. The designated use of the stream is for aquatic life.

Red Brook is not designated as an impaired waterbody.

History and recreation
Red Brook was entered into the Geographic Names Information System on August 2, 1979. Its identifier in the Geographic Names Information System is 1199361.

Historical features in the vicinity of Red Brook include an old railroad grade and the remains of an old camp. The stream has been named one of the top ten places for hiking in Wyoming County. It has been described by Jeff Mitchell as "A special place in Wyoming County." Logging was probably done in the Coalbed Swamp area of the stream's watershed in the 1890s, but it is currently in good condition.

Biology
Coalbed Swamp, which is in the watershed of Red Brook, is listed on the Wyoming County Natural Areas Inventory. This swamp is home to part of the largest population of yellow-bellied flycatchers in Pennsylvania. The rest of the area consists of a shrub swamp dominated by blueberry bushes, leatherleaf, and sedges.

See also
List of rivers of Pennsylvania

References

Tributaries of Mehoopany Creek